This is a list of 134 species in Ceraclea, a genus of long-horned caddisflies in the family Leptoceridae.

Ceraclea species

 Ceraclea acutipennis Yang & Tian, 1989 i c g
 Ceraclea alabamae Harris, 1989 i c g
 Ceraclea alagma (Ross, 1938) i c g
 Ceraclea albimacula (Rambur, 1842) i c g
 Ceraclea alboguttata (Hagen, 1860) i c g
 Ceraclea albosticta (Hagen, 1861) i c g
 Ceraclea alces (Ross, 1941) i c g
 Ceraclea ampliata Yang & Morse, 2000 i c g
 Ceraclea ancylus (Vorhies, 1909) i c g
 Ceraclea annulicornis (Stephens, 1836) i c g
 Ceraclea arielles (Denning, 1942) i c g
 Ceraclea armata Kumanski, 1991 i c g
 Ceraclea aurea (Pictet, 1834) i c g
 Ceraclea batia (Mosely, 1939) i c g
 Ceraclea bifurcata Morse, Yang & Levanidova, 1997 i c g
 Ceraclea brachyacantha Yang & Tian, 1987 i c g
 Ceraclea brachycerca Yang & Tian, 1989 i c g
 Ceraclea brachyclada Yang & Morse, 1997 i c g
 Ceraclea brevis (Etnier, 1968) i c g
 Ceraclea cama (Flint, 1965) i c g
 Ceraclea cancellata (Betten, 1934) i c g
 Ceraclea celata Yang & Morse, 2000 i c g
 Ceraclea chirindensis (Kimmins, 1956) i c g
 Ceraclea complicata (Kobayashi, 1984) i c g
 Ceraclea congolensis (Mosely, 1939) i c g
 Ceraclea copha (Ross, 1938) i c g
 Ceraclea corbeti (Kimmins, 1957) i c g
 Ceraclea coreana Kumanski, 1991 i c g
 Ceraclea cuprea (Barnard, 1934) i c g
 Ceraclea curva Yang & Tian, 1989 i c g
 Ceraclea diluta (Hagen, 1861) i c g
 Ceraclea dingwuschanella (Ulmer, 1932) i c g
 Ceraclea disemeiensis Yang in Yang, Wang & Leng, 1997 i c g
 Ceraclea dissimilis (Stephens, 1836) i c g
 Ceraclea distinguenda (Martynov, 1936) i c g
 Ceraclea egeria Malicky & Chaibu in Malicky, 2000 i c g
 Ceraclea elongata Yang & Morse, 2000 i c g
 Ceraclea emeiensis Yang & Tian, 1989 i c g
 Ceraclea enodis Whitlock & Morse, 1994 b
 Ceraclea ensifera (Martynov, 1935) i c g
 Ceraclea equiramosa Morse, Yang & Levanidova, 1997 i c g
 Ceraclea erratica (Milne, 1936) i c g
 Ceraclea erulla (Ross, 1938) i c g
 Ceraclea excisa (Morton, 1904) i c g
 Ceraclea exilis Morse, 1988 i c g
 Ceraclea flava (Banks, 1904) i c g
 Ceraclea floridana (Banks, 1903) i c g
 Ceraclea fooensis (Mosely, 1942) i c g
 Ceraclea forcipata (Forsslund, 1935) i c g
 Ceraclea fulva (Rambur, 1842) i c g
 Ceraclea gigantea Kumanski, 1991 i c g
 Ceraclea giudicellii Marlier, 1986 i c g
 Ceraclea globosa Yang & Morse, 1988 i c g
 Ceraclea grossa Yang & Morse, 2000 i c g
 Ceraclea guineensis Gibon, 1986 i c g
 Ceraclea hastata (Botosaneanu, 1970) i c g
 Ceraclea huangi (Tian, 1981) i c g
 Ceraclea indistincta (Forsslund, 1935) i c g
 Ceraclea interispina Yang & Tian, 1987 i c g
 Ceraclea isurumuniya (Schmid, 1958) i c g
 Ceraclea kamonis (Tsuda, 1942) i c g
 Ceraclea kolthoffi (Ulmer, 1932) i c g
 Ceraclea latahensis (Smith, 1962) i c g
 Ceraclea lirata Yang & Morse, 1988 i c g
 Ceraclea litania Botosaneanu & Dia in Dia & Botosaneanu, 1983 i c g
 Ceraclea lobulata (Martynov, 1935) i c g
 Ceraclea maccalmonti Moulton & Stewart, 1992 i c g
 Ceraclea macronemoides Malicky, 1975 i c g
 Ceraclea maculata (Banks, 1899) i c g b
 Ceraclea major (Hwang, 1957) i c g
 Ceraclea marginata (Banks, 1911) i c g
 Ceraclea martynovi (Forsslund, 1940) i c g
 Ceraclea mentiea (Walker, 1852) i c g
 Ceraclea merga Chen & Morce, 1992 g
 Ceraclea microbatia (Marlier, 1956) i c g
 Ceraclea minima (Kimmins, 1956) i c g
 Ceraclea mitis (Tsuda, 1942) i c g
 Ceraclea modesta (Banks, 1920) i c g
 Ceraclea morsei Kumanski, 1991 i c g
 Ceraclea nankingensis (Hwang, 1957) i c g
 Ceraclea neffi (Resh, 1974) i c g
 Ceraclea nepha (Ross, 1944) i c g
 Ceraclea nibenica Gonzalez & Terra, 1988 i c g
 Ceraclea nigronervosa (Retzius, 1783) i c g
 Ceraclea njalaensis (Mosely, 1933) i c g
 Ceraclea norfolki (Navas, 1917) i c g
 Ceraclea nycteola Mey, 1997 i c g
 Ceraclea nygmatica (Navas, 1917) i c g
 Ceraclea ophioderus (Ross, 1938) i c g
 Ceraclea parakamonis Yang & Morse, 2000 i c g
 Ceraclea perplexa (McLachlan, 1877) i c g
 Ceraclea polyacantha Yang & Tian, 1987 i c g
 Ceraclea protonepha Morse & Ross in Morse, 1975 i c g
 Ceraclea pulchra (Ulmer, 1912) i c g
 Ceraclea punctata (Banks, 1894) i c g
 Ceraclea quadrispina Marlier, 1965 i c g
 Ceraclea ramburi Morse, 1975 i c g
 Ceraclea resurgens (Walker, 1852) i c g b
 Ceraclea riparia (Albarda, 1874) i c g
 Ceraclea ruthae (Flint, 1965) i c g
 Ceraclea satasookae  g
 Ceraclea schoutedeni (Navás, 1930) i c g
 Ceraclea seikunis (Kobayashi, 1987) i c g
 Ceraclea semicircularis Yang & Morse, 1997 i c g
 Ceraclea senilis (Burmeister, 1839) i c g
 Ceraclea shuotsuensis (Tsuda, 1942) i c g
 Ceraclea sibirica (Ulmer, 1906) i c g
 Ceraclea signaticornis (Ulmer, 1926) i c g
 Ceraclea sinensis (Forsslund, 1935) i c g
 Ceraclea singularis Yang & Morse, 2000 i c g
 Ceraclea slossonae (Banks, 1938) i c g b
 Ceraclea sobradiei (Navas, 1917) i c g
 Ceraclea spinosa (Navás, 1930) i c g
 Ceraclea spinulicolis Yang & Morse, 1988 i c g
 Ceraclea spongillovorax (Resh, 1974) i c g
 Ceraclea squamosa (Ulmer, 1905) i c g
 Ceraclea submacula (Walker, 1852) i c g
 Ceraclea superba (Tsuda, 1942) i c g
 Ceraclea takatsunis (Kobayashi, 1987) i c g
 Ceraclea tarsipunctata (Vorhies, 1909) i c g
 Ceraclea thongnooi Laudee, Seetapan & Malicky, 2017 g
 Ceraclea thongpongi Laudee, Seetapan & Malicky, 2017 g
 Ceraclea transversa (Hagen, 1861) i c g b
 Ceraclea trifurca Yang & Morse, 1988 i c g
 Ceraclea trilobulata Morse, Yang & Levanidova, 1997 i c g
 Ceraclea trisdikooni Laudee, Seetapan & Malicky, 2017 g
 Ceraclea ungulifera (Kimmins, 1963) i c g
 Ceraclea uvalo (Ross, 1938) i c g
 Ceraclea vaciva Yang & Morse, 1997 i c g
 Ceraclea valentinae Arefina, 1997 i c g
 Ceraclea variabilis (Martynov, 1935) i c g
 Ceraclea vertreesi (Denning, 1966) i c g
 Ceraclea wetzeli (Ross, 1941) i c g
 Ceraclea yangi Mosely, 1942 i c g

Data sources: i = ITIS, c = Catalogue of Life, g = GBIF, b = Bugguide.net

References

Ceraclea
Articles created by Qbugbot